This is a list of Royal Navy ship names starting with C.

C

 
 
 
 
 
 
 
 
 
 
 
 
 
 
 
 
 
 
 
 
 
 
 
 
 
 
 
 
 
 
 
 
 
 
 
 
 
 
 
 
 
 
 
 
 
 
 
 
 
 
  
 
 
 
 
 
  
 
 
 
 
 
 
 
 
 
 
 
 
 
 
 
 
 
 
 
 
 
 
 
 Camelion
 
 
 
 
 
 
 
 
 
 Campeador V
 
 Camphaan
 
 
 
 
 
 
 
 
 
 
 
 
 Cape Argona
 Cape Chelyuskin 
 Cape Comorin
 Cape Finisterre
 
 Cape Passaro 
 
 Cape Siretoko
 Cape Spartel
 Cape Warwick
 Cape Wrath
 Capel
 Capelin
 Capetown
 Caprice
 Capricornus 
 
 Captivity
 Caradoc
 Caraquet
 Carcass
 Cardiff
 Cardigan Bay
 Cardingham
 Careful
 Carew Castle
 Carhampton
 
 
 
 Carlisle
 Carlotta
 
 
 Carmen
 
 
 
 Carnatic
 Carnation
 Carolina
 Caroline
 
 Carrere
 
 
 Carrier
 
 
 Carron
 Carronade
 Carry On
 Carstairs
 
 
 Carysfort
 Cashel
 Cassandra
 Cassius
 Castilian
 Castle
 Castle Harbour
 Castlereagh
 Castleton
 Castor
 Cat
 
 Caterham
 
 Catherine
 Cato
 Caton
 Catterick
 Cattistock
 Caunton
 Cauvery
 Cavalier
 Cavan
 
 
 Cawsand Bay
 Cawsand
 Cayenne
 Cayman
 Cayton Wyke
 Ceanothus
 
 Celandine
 Celebes
 Celerity
 
 Celt
 
 Censeur
 Censor
 
 
 Cephalus
 Cerbere
 
 Ceres
 Cerf
 
 Cessnock
 
 
 Ceylon
 Chailey
 
 
 Challenger
 Chameleon
 Chamois
 Champion
 Chance
 
 
 Chanticleer
 Chaplet
 Charde
 Charger
 Charity
 Charles
 Charles Boyes
 
 Charles V
 Charles and Henry
 Charles Galley
 Charlestown
 Charlock
 Charlotte
 Charon
 Charwell
 Charybdis
 Chaser
 Chasseur
 
 Chatham Double
 Chatham Hulk
 Chatham Prize
 Chatsgrove
 Chawton
 Cheam
 Chediston
 Cheerful
 Cheerly
 Chelmer
 Chelmsford
 Chelsea
 Chelsham
 Cheltenham
 Chengteh
 Chepstow Castle
 Chepstow
 Chequers
 Cheriton
 Cherokee
 Cherub
 Charwell
 Cherwell
 Chesapeake
 Cheshire
 
 
 
 Chestnut
 Cheviot
 Chevreuil
 Chevron
 Chichester
 Chiddingfold
 Chieftain
 Chilcompton
 Childers
 Childs Play
 Chillingham
 Chilton
 
 Chippeway
 
 Chivalrous
 Cholmondeley
 Christ
 Christchurch Castle
 Christian VII
 Christine Rose
 
 Christopher Spayne

 
 Chrysanthemum
 Chub
 Chubb
 Church
 Churchill
 Cicala
 Cicero
 
 
 Circassian
 Circe
 Citadel
 
 
 City of Edinburgh II
 
 
 Clacton
 
 Clara
 Clarbeston
 
 
 Clarence
 Clarkia
 Claudia
 Claverhouse
 Clavering Castle
 Claymore
 
 Clematis
 
 Cleopatra
 Cleveland
 Clifton
 Clinker
 Clinton
 Clio
 Clitheroe Castle
 Clive
 Clonmel
 Clorinde
 Clove Tree
 Clovelly

 Cloughton Wyke
 Clover
 Clown
 Clun Castle
 Clyde
 Clydebank
 Cobbers
 Cobham
 Cobra
 Cochin
 Cochrane
 Cockade
 Cockatrice
 Cockburn
 Cockchafer
 
 
 Codrington
 
 
 Colibri
 Colleen
 Collingwood
 Collinson
 Colne
 Colombe
 Colombo
 Colossus
 Coltsfoot
 
 Columbia
 Columbine
 Colwyn
 Combatant
 Combustion
 Comeet
 Comet
 
 Comfrey
 Commandant Domine
 Commandant Duboc
 Commander Holbrook
 Commerce de Marseille
 Commonwealth
 
 Comus
 Conception
 Concord
 Concorde
 Condor
 Confederate
 Confiance
 Conflagration
 Conflict
 Confounder
 Congo
 Coniston
 Conn
 Conquerant
 Conquerante
 
 
 Conquest
 Conquestador
 Conquistador
 Consort
 
 
 
 
 
 Constitution
 Contender
 Content
 Contest
 Convert
 Convertine
 Convolvulus
 Convulsion
 Conway
 Cook
 Cooke
 Coote
 
 Coquette
 Coquille
 
 
 Cordelia
 Coreopsis
 Corfe Castle
 
 
 Coriander
 
 Cormorant
 Cornel
 Cornelia
 Cornelian
 Cornet Castle
 Cornflower
 Cornwall
 Cornwallis
 Coromandel
 
 Coronation
 Corso
 Corunna
 
 Cosby
 Cossack
 Cotillion
 Cotswold
 Cottesmore
 Cotton
 Coucy
 Counterguard
 Countess of Carinthia
 Countess of Hopetoun
 Countess of Scarborough
 Courageous
 Courageux
 Courbet
 Coureur
 Coureuse
 Courier
 Courser
 Coventry
 
 Cowdray
 Cowes Castle
 Cowling Castle
 Cowper
 Cowslip
 Craccher
 Crache-Feu
 Cracker
 Cradley
 Crafty
 Craigie
 Crane
 Cranefly
 Cranham
 Cranstoun
 Crash
 Craufurd
 Crediton
 Creole
 Crescent
 Cressy
 
 Crestflower
 Cretan
 Criccieth Castle
 Crichton
 Cricket
 Crispin
 Crocodile
 Crocus
 Crofton
 Cromarty
 
 
 Cromwell
 Croome
 Crossbow
 Crow
 
 
 
 Croxton
 Crozier
 Croziers
 Cruelle
 Cruiser
 Cruizer
 Crusader
 Crystal
 Cuba
 Cubitt
 Cuckmere
 Cuckoo
 Cuffley
 Cullin Sound
 Culloden
 Culver
 Culverin
 Cumberland
 Cupar
 Cupid
 Curacoa
 Curieux
 Curlew
 Curragh
 Curzon
 Cutlass
 Cutter
 Cuttle
 Cuxton

See also
 List of aircraft carriers of the Royal Navy
 List of amphibious warfare ships of the Royal Navy
 List of pre-dreadnought battleships of the Royal Navy
 List of dreadnought battleships of the Royal Navy
 List of battlecruisers of the Royal Navy
 List of cruiser classes of the Royal Navy
 List of destroyer classes of the Royal Navy
 List of patrol vessels of the Royal Navy
 List of frigate classes of the Royal Navy
 List of monitors of the Royal Navy
 List of mine countermeasure vessels of the Royal Navy (includes minesweepers and mine hunters)
 List of Royal Fleet Auxiliary ship names
 List of submarines of the Royal Navy
 List of survey vessels of the Royal Navy
 List of Royal Navy shore establishments

References
 

Names C
Royal Navy C
 C
Royal Navy ships C